Brazier is an occupational surname of French origin, meaning "a worker in brass". It is the anglicised version of the French surname Brasier. The surname may refer to:

Alan Brazier (1924–1999), English cricketer
Arthur M. Brazier (1921–2010), American bishop
Brendan Brazier (born 1975), Canadian athlete
Brook Brasier (1879–1940), Irish politician
Caroline Brazier (born 1971), Australian actress
Caroline Brazier (librarian), Scottish librarian
Colin Brazier (footballer) (born 1957), British football player
Colin Brazier  (born 1968), British journalist
Donavan Brazier (born 1997), American runner
Eugénie Brazier (1895–1977), French chef
Frank Brazier (1934–2021), Australian Olympic cyclist
Graham Brazier (1952–2015), New Zealand musician
Harold Brazier (born 1955), American boxer
James Brazier (c. 1926–1958), African-American murdered by police in Dawson, Georgia
Jeff Brazier (born 1979), British television presenter
John Brazier (1842–1930), Australian zoologist
Joseph Brazier, British gun manufacturer
Julian Brazier (born 1953), British politician
Kelly Brazier (born 1989), New Zealand rugby player
Margaret Brazier (born 1950), British legal scholar
Marion Howard Brazier (1850–1935), American journalist, editor, lecturer, clubwoman
Martin Brasier (1947–2014), British biologist
Mary Brazier (1904–1995), American neuroscientist 
Matt Brazier (1976–2019), English football player
Nicolas Brazier (1783–1838), French writer
Robert Boyd Brazier (1916–1942), American sailor
Robert H. B. Brazier (died 1837), British surveyor
Rodney Brazier (born 1946), British lawyer
Ryan Brasier (born 1987), American professional baseball pitcher
Will Brazier (born 1983), American rugby player
William Brazier (1755–1829), British cricketer

See also
Brasier, French automobile manufacturer
Brazier (hieroglyph)
Le Brasier, a 1991 French film
Theresa May (born 1956), British prime minister

English-language surnames
French-language surnames
Occupational surnames
English-language occupational surnames